"Tricks of the Light" is a single by musician Mike Oldfield released in 1984 and is from the Virgin Records album Discovery. Maggie Reilly and Barry Palmer perform vocals for this song.

The single's B-side, "Afghan" (working title "Celtic", is a non-album track, and was recorded at the same time as the Discovery album. The single also features an instrumental version of "Tricks of the Light".

Music video 
The music video for "Tricks of the Light" is a mock-live performance of the song and focuses on a girl in the audience. Interspersed are non-concert scenes of the same girl with and without sunglasses. Oldfield plays a Fender Stratocaster in the video and a Fairlight CMI appears on stage. The clip is available on the Elements – The Best of Mike Oldfield video.

Track listing 
 "Tricks of the Light" – 3:52
 "Afghan" – 2:45
 "Tricks of the Light" (Instrumental) – 3:56

Charts

References 

1984 singles
Mike Oldfield songs
Maggie Reilly songs
Songs written by Mike Oldfield
1984 songs
Virgin Records singles